Bär (or Baer, from German: bear) is the surname may refer to:

 Abraham Dob Bär Lebensohn (c. 1789/1794–1878), Russian poet and grammarian
 Dietmar Bär (born 1961), German actor
 Dorothee Bär (born 1978), German politician
 Heinrich Bär (1913–1957), German Luftwaffe fighter ace in World War II
 Karl Bär (born 1985), German politician
 Olaf Bär (born 1957), German operatic baritone
 Philippe Bär (born 1928), Dutch former bishop
 Bär McKinnon (born 1969), American musician

See also  
 René-Louis Baire, French mathematician (1874-1932)
 Tekeste Baire, Eritrean trade unionist
 Baer, surname list
 Bähr  (transliterated Baehr), surname list
 Bahr (surname)
 Bear (disambiguation)

German-language surnames
Jewish given names
Jewish surnames
Surnames from nicknames